The term "smoking gun" is a reference to an object or fact that serves as conclusive evidence of a crime or similar act, just short of being caught in flagrante delicto. "Smoking gun" refers to the strongest kind of circumstantial evidence, as opposed to direct evidence. Direct evidence would include the entire action; i.e. the action of pulling the trigger, firing the gun, and the victim falling.

Phrase origin
The phrase originally came from the idea that finding a very recently fired (hence smoking) gun on the person of a suspect wanted for shooting someone would in that situation be nearly unshakable proof of having committed the crime. A variant of the phrase (as "smoking pistol") is used in the Sherlock Holmes story, "The Adventure of the Gloria Scott" (1893).

Extended meaning
In addition to this, its meaning has evolved in uses completely unrelated to criminal activity: for example, scientific evidence that is highly suggestive in favor of a particular hypothesis is sometimes called "smoking gun evidence".

See also

Legal burden of proof

References

Metaphors referring to war and violence
Metaphors referring to objects
Evidence
Forensic evidence
Gun
English phrases